Ongarue railway station was a station on the North Island Main Trunk in New Zealand, serving the sawmill town of Ongarue.

In 1900 the station was known as Kawakawa and then Ongaruhe.

From 1922 to 1958 most of the timber freight at the station came from the connected Ellis and Burnand Tramway.

It was the scene of the Ongarue railway disaster in 1923, up to then, the worst rail crash in the country.

In 1941 the station employed a stationmaster and two clerks.

Patronage 

Passenger numbers peaked in 1944, as shown in the graph and table below -

References 

Ruapehu District
Defunct railway stations in New Zealand
Buildings and structures in Manawatū-Whanganui
Rail transport in Manawatū-Whanganui
Railway stations opened in 1901
Railway stations closed in 1975